Ahrendt is a German surname. Notable people with the surname include:

Bernd Ahrendt, German rower
Christian Ahrendt (born 1963), German politician
Lothar Ahrendt (born 1936), German politician
Peter Ahrendt (1934–2013), German sailor

See also
Angela Ahrendts (born 1960), U.S. businesswoman

German-language surnames

de:Ahrenstedt